Joe Lewis Thomas Jr. (born May 6, 1991) is an American football linebacker of the National Football League (NFL). He played college football at South Carolina State, and was signed by the Green Bay Packers as an undrafted free agent in 2014.

Early years
Thomas attended Blackville-Hilda High School, where he practiced football, basketball, track and soccer. In football he played as a running back, earning All-state honors in his last two years. As a senior, he rushed for 1,976 yards and 31 touchdowns, while being named Division 1A South Carolina Player of the Year.

In track, he competed in the 4 × 100 metres relay and the shot put.

College career
Thomas accepted a football scholarship from South Carolina State University. As a redshirt freshman, he played in 11 out of 12 games, contributing mainly on special teams, while posting 17 tackles (2 for loss), one pass defensed and a fumble recovery.

As a sophomore, he started 11 games at outside linebacker, recording 100 tackles (second on the team), 5 tackles for loss, 2.5 sacks, 3 interceptions (led the team) and a fumble recovery. He was named the team's defensive MVP at the end of the season. In his first career start at Central Michigan University, he had 10 tackles (three solo) and his first career interception. Against Indiana University, he made 14 tackles (7 solo). Against Georgia State University, he had 14 tackles (one for loss) and one interception.

As a junior, he started the first 6 games at middle linebacker, before being lost for the season with an injury. Against North Carolina Central University, he had 39 tackles (5 for loss), one sack, one pass defensed and a forced fumble. Against Bethune-Cookman University, he made 11 tackles (3 tackles for loss) and one sack. Against the University of Arizona, he had 10 tackles (8 solo) and a forced fumble.

As a senior, he was a part of a defense that ranked No. 1 in the FCS 1-AA. He helped the school earn its 15th MEAC Championship, winning 17-3 against Norfolk State University, where he made 10 tackles (4 for a loss), and one sack. 
He started 13 games, registering 115 tackles (led the team), 19 tackles for loss, 7.5 sacks, 5 passes defensed, one interception, one forced fumble and a fumble recovery. Against Alabama A&M University, he had 12 tackles (5 for loss), 3 sacks and one pass defensed. Against Bethune-Cookman University, he made 16 tackles (9 solo), one sack and a fumble recovery. He also earned Mid-Eastern Athletic Conference Defensive Player of the Year and All-conference honors.

He finished his college career with 41 games (30 starts), 271 tackles (188 solo), 31 tackles for loss, 11.5 sacks, 4 interceptions, 9 passes defensed, 2 forced fumbles and 3 fumble recoveries.

Professional career

Green Bay Packers
Thomas was signed as an undrafted free agent by the Green Bay Packers after the 2014 NFL Draft on May 12. On August 26, 2014, he was placed on the Injured reserve list with a knee injury. Thomas was released after reaching an injury settlement on August 30. On November 3, he was signed to the Packers' practice squad, where he spent the rest of his rookie season.

Thomas was signed to a future contract on January 20, 2015. He was waived on September 5.

Dallas Cowboys
Thomas was signed to the Dallas Cowboys' practice squad on September 8, 2015.

Green Bay Packers (second stint)
On September 21, 2015, Thomas was signed to the Green Bay Packers' active roster off the Cowboys' practice squad. He appeared in 14 games, making 24 tackles (16 solo), one sack, one forced fumble, 4 quarterback pressures, 2 passes defensed and 9 special teams tackles (fourth on the team). He played in the 2 playoff games and had eight tackles.

In 2016, he appeared in 16 games (7 starts) at inside linebacker, making 77 total tackles (fourth on the team), 62 solo tackles, 8 passes defensed, one interception and one fumble recovery. He recorded his first NFL interception against Blake Bortles and the Jacksonville Jaguars in Week 1. He collected 10 tackles both against the Seattle Seahawks and Chicago Bears. On December 18, Thomas laid a hit on Chicago's Ka'Deem Carey with so much force, that the "C" decal on Carey's helmet flew off. The Packers won the game 30–27. He played in all 3 playoff games (2 starts), tying for No. 4 on the team with 13 tackles.

Thomas re-signed with the Packers on March 7, 2017. He appeared in 12 games (one start), missing 4 contests with an ankle injury. He finished with 14 tackles, a half sack and one pass defensed.

Dallas Cowboys (second stint)
On March 21, 2018, Thomas signed a two-year deal with the Dallas Cowboys. He was a backup linebacker, appearing in 10 games, after suffering a foot injury in the Week 5 game against the Houston Texans and missing next four games. He posted 6 tackles (one for loss), one quarterback pressure and 5 special teams tackles (sixth on the team).

In 2019, he appeared in 15 games with 2 starts, playing mostly on special teams. He registered 36 tackles, one quarterback pressure, one forced fumble, one pass deflection and 5 special teams tackles (tied for fifth on the team). He had a season-high 6 tackles in the third game against the Miami Dolphins. He made 3 tackles, one quarterback pressure, one pass breakup, one forced fumble and 2 special teams tackles in the fourteenth game against the Chicago Bears. He made his first start as a Cowboy in place of an injured Vander Esch in the fourteenth game against the Los Angeles Rams, tallying 2 tackles before leaving with a knee injury. He started again in the next game against the Philadelphia Eagles. He was declared inactive with a knee injury in the season finale against the Washington Redskins.

On March 31, 2020, Thomas re-signed with the Cowboys. He was released on September 6, 2020, but re-signed the next day. He stepped in when starter Leighton Vander Esch suffered an injury in the first quarter of the season opener against Los Angeles Rams. He started the next 4 games at middle linebacker, after Vander Esch was placed on the injured reserve list. He had a career-high 12 tackles (one for loss) in the second game against the Atlanta Falcons. He finished with 43 tackles (3 for loss), 2 passes defensed and 5 quarterback pressures in 15 games with 4 starts.

Houston Texans
Thomas signed a one-year contract with the Houston Texans on March 22, 2021. He was released on October 16, 2021.

Baltimore Ravens
On October 19, 2021, Thomas was signed to the Baltimore Ravens practice squad.

Chicago Bears
On March 1, 2022, Thomas signed a one-year contract with the Chicago Bears. He was released on August 31, 2022 and signed to the practice squad the next day. He was promoted to the active roster on September 27.

NFL career statistics

Regular season

Postseason

Personal life
Thomas' father, Joe Thomas Sr., attended his alma mater, South Carolina State University, and became the oldest player (55 years old) to play in an NCAA Division I game on November 19, 2016, when he had a carry for three yards. Unfortunately the father and son were never teammates at South Carolina State since Joe Thomas Sr. was unable to play during Thomas Jr.'s tenure from 2010-2013 after suffering injuries in a car accident.

References

External links
South Carolina State Bulldogs bio

1991 births
Living people
People from Blackville, South Carolina
Players of American football from South Carolina
American football linebackers
South Carolina State Bulldogs football players
Green Bay Packers players
Dallas Cowboys players
Sportspeople from Aiken, South Carolina
African-American players of American football
Houston Texans players
Baltimore Ravens players
21st-century African-American sportspeople
Chicago Bears players